The postsynaptic density (PSD) is a protein dense specialization attached to the postsynaptic membrane.  PSDs were originally identified by electron microscopy as an electron-dense region at the membrane of a postsynaptic neuron. The PSD is in close apposition to the presynaptic active zone and ensures that receptors are in close proximity to presynaptic neurotransmitter release sites. PSDs vary in size and composition among brain regions, and have been studied in great detail at glutamatergic synapses. Hundreds of proteins have been identified in the postsynaptic density, including glutamate receptors, scaffold proteins, and many signaling molecules.

Structure
The structure and composition of the PSD have been the focus of numerous molecular studies of synaptic plasticity, a cellular model of learning and memory. PSDs are sized on the order of 250 to 500 nanometres in diameter and 25 to 50 nanometres in thickness, depending on the activity state of the synapse. During synaptic plasticity, the total size of the PSD is increasing along with an increase in synaptic size and strength after inducing long-term potentiation at single synapses.

Composition
Many proteins in the PSD are involved in the regulation of synaptic function. These include

 postsynaptic density-95 (PSD95)
 neuroligin (a cellular adhesion molecule)
 NMDA receptors, AMPA receptors
 calcium/calmodulin-dependent protein kinase II
 actin

As protein detection technologies have increased in sensitivity, such as with improvements in mass spectrometry techniques, more numerous proteins have been attributed to the PSD.  Current estimates are greater than several hundred proteins are found at PSDs among brain regions and during different states of development and synaptic activity.  PSDs also contain cell adhesion molecules and a diverse set of other signaling proteins. Many of the PSD proteins contain PDZ domains.

Function
The PSD has been proposed to concentrate and organize neurotransmitter receptors in the synaptic cleft. The PSD also serves as a signaling apparatus. For instance kinases and phosphatases in the PSD are activated and released from the PSD to change the activity of proteins located in the spine or are transported to the nucleus to affect protein synthesis. Some of the features of the PSD are similar to the neuromuscular junction and other cellular junctions, as the PSD has been modeled as a specialized cellular junction that allows for rapid, asymmetrical signaling.

References

General review

Structure and composition

External links
 Postsynaptic Density- Cell Centered Database

Neurohistology